Post-neoliberalism, also known as anti-neoliberalism, is a set of ideals characterized by its rejection of neoliberalism and the economic policies embodied by the Washington Consensus. While there is scholarly debate about the defining features of post-neoliberalism, it is often associated with economic policies of nationalization and wealth redistribution, opposition to deregulation, financialization, free trade, and the weakening of labour relations, and left-wing politics more generally.

The movement has had particular influence in Latin America, where the pink tide brought about a substantial shift towards left-wing governments in the 2000s. Examples of post-neoliberal governments include the former governments of Evo Morales in Bolivia and Rafael Correa in Ecuador.

History 

The idea of post-neoliberalism arose during the pink tide of the 1990s and 2000s, in which left-wing Latin American critics of neoliberalism like Hugo Chávez and Evo Morales were thrust into power. According to researchers, the election of Chávez as the president of Venezuela in 1999 marked a definite start to the pink tide and post-neoliberal movement. Following his election, Rafael Correa, Néstor Kirchner, Evo Morales, and numerous other leaders associated with the post-neoliberal movement were elected in Latin America during the 2000s and 2010s. Into the 2020s, the Chilean president-elect Gabriel Boric, who emerged victorious in the 2021 Chilean general election, pledged to end the country's neoliberal economic model, stating: "If Chile was the cradle of neoliberalism, it will also be its grave."

While the ideas of post-neoliberalism are not exclusive to Latin America, they are largely associated with the region. Post-neoliberalism has drawn criticism from the right of the political spectrum; right-wing and far-right critics have claimed that the term itself is vague and populistic, while also arguing that "post-neoliberal" policies harm international investment and economic development.

Ideology 
Post-neoliberalism seeks to fundamentally change the role of the state in countries where the Washington Consensus once prevailed. To achieve this, post-neoliberal leaders in Latin America have advocated for the nationalization of several industries, notably the gas, mining, and oil industries. Post-neoliberalism also advocates for the expansion of welfare benefits, greater governmental investment in poverty reduction, and increased state intervention in the economy.

List of anti-neoliberal or post-neoliberal political parties 

South America:
 Argentina: Frente de Todos, Front for Victory
 Bolivia: Movement for Socialism
 Chile: Social Convergence
 Ecuador: Citizen Revolution Movement, PAIS Alliance under Rafael Correa
 Venezuela: Fifth Republic Movement, Great Patriotic Pole, United Socialist Party of Venezuela under Hugo Chávez

North America:
 Mexico: Morena
 Quebec: Québec Solidaire, Green Party of Quebec
 United States: Green Mountain Peace and Justice Party, Party for Socialism and Liberation

Asia
 Japan: Social Democratic Party
 South Korea: Progressive Party
 Turkey: Communist Party of Turkey, Patriotic Party

See also 
 Anti-capitalism
 Kirchnerism
 Post-capitalism
 Socialism of the 21st century

References

Further reading

External links 
 
  
 

Latin America
Left-wing politics
Left-wing populism in South America
Neoliberalism
Political terminology
Anti-capitalism